Julian Howard Beale (10 October 1934 – 3 August 2021) was an Australian businessman and federal politician. He was the son of former cabinet minister and ambassador Sir Howard Beale.

Julian Beale was a Liberal member of the Australian Parliament for four consecutive terms, representing the seat of Deakin in Victoria from 1984 to 1990 and Bruce from 1990 to 1996.

Beale served the four terms while in opposition. He served as a shadow minister under John Howard, Andrew Peacock and John Hewson from 1985 to 1993, after which he returned to the backbench before being defeated at the 1996 election following a redistribution of his seat. He later became the chairman of Adacel Technologies, a communications company, since 2003; and was a director of Visy Industries.

He was the father of Debbie Beale, the former wife of Bill Shorten, who was Australian Leader of the Opposition and was later appointed Minister for the National Disability Insurance Scheme and Government Services in the Albanese ministry. Beale died on 3 August 2021, aged 86.

Notes

1934 births
2021 deaths
Politicians from Sydney
Liberal Party of Australia members of the Parliament of Australia
Members of the Australian House of Representatives
Members of the Australian House of Representatives for Bruce
Members of the Australian House of Representatives for Deakin
20th-century Australian politicians